SimEx-Iwerks Entertainment specializes in high-tech entertainment systems, films, film technologies, film-based software, Simulation Hardware Systems and services. The company has partnerships with various institutions, parks, and destinations.

The company has been serving the amusement industry for 30 years, through three operating divisions: Attractions Development; Content Licensing, Production & Distribution; and Technology/Engineering.

SimEx Inc. is the parent company of SimEx-Iwerks Entertainment. The company is based in Toronto, Canada with additional locations in Baltimore, Maryland; and Santa Clarita, California.

History

Iwerks Entertainment Inc. is an American film studio founded in 1985 in Burbank, California, by Oscar winner and Disney Legend Don Iwerks and Stan Kinsey, both former Disney Executives. The company was named to honor Don's father, Ub Iwerks, who was Walt Disney's first business partner and co-creator of Mickey Mouse.

Since the merger of SimEx Inc. and Iwerks Entertainment Inc. in 2002, the company traded under the name “SimEx-Iwerks Entertainment” with its head office in Toronto and Iwerks offices in Baltimore and Los Angeles.

SimEx's origins lie with the creation by Michael Needham, Shiori Sudo and Moses Znaimer of Tour of the Universe (1984) at the CN Tower, Toronto. In the 1980s SimEx and Iwerks developed their own separate visions for motion ride attractions.

Toronto based SimEx developed a series of attraction products using motion systems provided by Moog Inc. of East Aurora, New York. Moog's technology integrated novel electromechanical actuators with solid-state control systems to create a variety of attraction platforms.

In 1996, SimEx launched SimEx Virtual Voyages, a 15-minute attraction that follows a 3-stage storyline: introduction (pre-show); plot development (story theater); and climax (the ride). Over 40 SimEx Virtual Voyages attractions were built worldwide.

Los Angeles-based Iwerks developed innovative 8/70 projection technologies for Extreme Screen Theaters and two-seat motion systems (TurboRide). In 1998, Iwerks Co-founder Don Iwerks was awarded the Gordon E. Sawyer Award from the Academy of Motion Picture Arts & Sciences in recognition of his lifetime of contribution to the science and technology of motion pictures.

In 2000, Iwerks launched its Iwerks Extreme Screen Bran. In the same year, the Iwerks 8/70 Linear Loop projection system was recognized for its industry leading technology with an Academy Award for Scientific and Technical Achievement.

In 2001, SimEx acquired assets from the RideFilm Division of Imax Corporation and in 2002, SimEx merged with Iwerks Entertainment.

In 2003, SimEx-Iwerks designed the first full-motion 4-D seat for Universal Studio's Shrek 4-D attractions in Hollywood, Orlando and Osaka.

In late 1999, Iwerks Entertainment acquired the assets of McFadden Systems. In 1992, Warner Bros. Movie World approached McFadden to develop a motion simulator for Batman Adventure – The Ride. Later motion systems were built for Star Trek: The Experience, London Trocadero.

Academy Awards

Iwerks Entertainment has received two Academy Awards by the Academy of Motion Picture Arts and Sciences for Scientific and Technical Achievement.

The first occurred in 1998 at the 70th Academy Awards show, where founder Don Iwerks was awarded the Gordon E. Sawyer Award, given each year to "an individual in the motion picture industry whose technological contributions have brought credit to the industry."

The second occurred in 1999 at the 71st Academy Awards show, where the company was awarded an Academy Award for a technical innovation called the Iwerks 8/70 Linear Loop projection system.

Key personnel (2020)
Michael Needham, president and CEO, founder;
Shiori Sudo, executive vice president, founder;
Mike Frueh, senior vice president, licensing and distribution;
Brian Ferguson, senior vice president, technology, operations and engineering;
Richard Needham, creative director

Product range
SimEx-Iwerks Experiences include 3-D, 4-D and VR attractions, motion simulation rides, and flying theaters. Over 350 attractions have been built by the SimEx-Iwerks group in over 40 countries.

Film library
SimEx-Iwerks active film library consists of over 125 films.

References

External links
 

Cinemas and movie theatres in Canada
Virtual reality companies
Canadian companies established in 1985
Movie theatre chains in Canada